"Silver Stallion" is a song written by Lee Clayton and originally released by him on his 1978 album Border Affair.

Track listing

The Highwaymen version 

The song was later covered by Waylon Jennings, Willie Nelson, Johnny Cash, and Kris Kristofferson and became the opening track of their 1990 album Highwayman 2. Released in 1990 as a lead single (Columbia 38-73233, with "American Remains" on the opposite side) from the album, the song peaked at number 25 on U.S. Billboard country chart for the week of April 28.

Track listing

Charts

References

External links 
 "Silver Stallion" on the Johnny Cash official website

Lee Clayton songs
The Highwaymen (country supergroup) songs
Waylon Jennings songs
Willie Nelson songs
Johnny Cash songs
Kris Kristofferson songs
Songs written by Lee Clayton
Song recordings produced by Chips Moman
1978 songs
1990 singles
Columbia Records singles
Vocal collaborations